Hélène Fillières (born 1 May 1972) is a French actress, film director and screenwriter. She is the sister of filmmaker Sophie Fillières.

Filmography

As actress

As director and screenwriter

References

External links

 

1972 births
Living people
French film actresses
French television actresses
20th-century French actresses
21st-century French actresses
Film directors from Paris
French women film directors
French women screenwriters
French screenwriters